During the 1976–77 season Hibernian, a football club based in Edinburgh, came sixth out of 10 clubs in the Scottish Premier Division and reached the fourth round of the Scottish Cup.

Scottish Premier Division

Final League table

Scottish League Cup

Group stage

Group 4 final table

UEFA Cup

Scottish Cup

See also
List of Hibernian F.C. seasons

References

External links
Hibernian 1976/1977 results and fixtures, Soccerbase

Hibernian F.C. seasons
Hibernian